"Room a Thousand Years Wide" is a song by the American rock band Soundgarden. Featuring lyrics written by guitarist Kim Thayil and music written by drummer Matt Cameron, the song was released as a single in 1990 through Sub Pop. A re-recorded version later appeared on the band's third studio album, Badmotorfinger (1991).

Origin and recording
"Room a Thousand Years Wide" is one of the few Soundgarden songs written without any input from frontman Chris Cornell. The song features lyrics written by guitarist Kim Thayil and music written by drummer Matt Cameron. It was also the first Soundgarden song to be recorded and released with bassist Ben Shepherd. Both the original and re-recorded version of the song that is featured on Badmotorfinger include the addition of a horn section featuring Scott Granlund (saxophone) and Ernst Long (trumpet). The song is in 6/4 time.

Lyrics
Thayil on "Room a Thousand Years Wide":
I really liked the music to the song and it needed words, and since no one else pursued it, I decided to. It's not really about things that have actually happened to me. It's more about experience in general. I've heard a lot of good ideas from people telling me what it's about. They said it's about God, Satan, Jesus, Satan, both, it's religious, it isn't religious ... The truth is, it's just me.

Release
"Room a Thousand Years Wide" was released as a single in 1990 with a previously unreleased B-side titled "H.I.V. Baby". It was released as a 7" through Sub Pop's Single of the Month club a full year before the release of Badmotorfinger.  The original version recorded for Sub Pop appears on the Deluxe Edition of the band's 2010 album Telephantasm.

Live performances
A performance of the song can be found on the Motorvision home video release.

Track listing
"Room a Thousand Years Wide" (Matt Cameron, Kim Thayil) – 4:15
"H.I.V. Baby" (Ben Shepherd, Chris Cornell) – 4:58

References

1990 singles
Soundgarden songs
Song recordings produced by Chris Cornell
Song recordings produced by Matt Cameron
Song recordings produced by Terry Date
Songs written by Matt Cameron
1990 songs
Songs written by Kim Thayil
Sub Pop singles
A&M Records singles
Doom metal songs